The electoral district of Cressy was a single-member electoral district of the Tasmanian House of Assembly. It centred on the town of Cressy to the south west of Launceston.

The seat was created ahead of the 1886 election out of the eastern section of the abolished seat of Ringwood, and was abolished at the 1903 election.

Members for Cressy

References
 
 
 Parliament of Tasmania (2006). The Parliament of Tasmania from 1956

Cressy